Roombia truncata is a species of katablepharids, which are heterotrophic single-celled organisms.

It was the first katablepharid to be generally available in cell culture, starting around 2009.  The culture consists of Roombia, the diatom Navicula, and unidentified bacteria.  Navicula provides the main food source for Roombia, although Roombia also feeds on the bacteria.

Roombia was named after the Roomba robotic vacuum cleaner.

References

External links
Video of Roombia feeding on a diatom
Video of Roombia excreting

Katablepharida